Zacuto may refer to:

 Abraham Zacuto, a Sephardi Jewish astronomer, astrologer, mathematician, rabbi and historian
 Zacuto (camera accessories), a manufacturer of camera accessories for filmmaking and photography